Mount Ehrenspeck is one of the Cathedral Peaks, a group of summits that form a portion of the wall on the east side of Shackleton Glacier, in the Queen Maud Mountains of Antarctica. It was named by the Advisory Committee on Antarctic Names for Helmut Ehrenspeck, a geologist with the Ohio State University Party of 1970–71 which geologically mapped this vicinity.

References 

Mountains of the Ross Dependency
Dufek Coast